The 2019–20 Nebraska Cornhuskers women's basketball team represented the University of Nebraska during the 2019–20 NCAA Division I women's basketball season. The Cornhuskers, led by fourth year head coach Amy Williams, played their home games at Pinnacle Bank Arena and were members of the Big Ten Conference.

They finished the season 17–13, 7–11 in Big Ten play to finish in tenth place. They lost in the second round of the Big Ten women's tournament to Mighican.  The NCAA tournament and WNIT were cancelled due to the COVID-19 outbreak.

Previous season
The Cornhuskers finished the season 14–16, 11–5 in Big Ten play to finish in a 4 way for sixth place. They lost in the second round of the Big Ten women's tournament to Purdue.  They were not invited to any post season tournaments.

Roster

Schedule

Source:

|-
!colspan=9 style=|Exhibition

|-
!colspan=9 style=| Non-conference regular season

|-
!colspan=9 style=| Big Ten conference season

|-
!colspan=9 style=| Big Ten Women's Tournament

Rankings

See also
2019–20 Nebraska Cornhuskers men's basketball team

References

Nebraska Cornhuskers women's basketball seasons
Nebraska
Cornhusk
Cornhusk